The city of Baltimore, Maryland, has been a predominantly working-class town through much of its history with several surrounding affluent suburbs and, being found in a Mid-Atlantic state but south of the Mason-Dixon line, can lay claim to a blend of Northern and Southern American traditions.

Food

Blue crabs

The most prominent example of Baltimore's distinctive flavor is the city's close association with blue crabs. This is a trait which Baltimore shares with the other coastal parts of the state of Maryland. The Chesapeake Bay for years was the East Coast's main source of blue crabs. Baltimore became an important hub of the crab industry. In Baltimore's tourist district (located between Harborplace and Fells Point), numerous restaurants serve steamed hard shell crabs, soft shell crabs, and lump backfin crabcakes. Many district shops even sell crab-related merchandise.

Traditionally, crabs are steamed in rock salt and Old Bay Seasoning, a favored local spice mixture manufactured in Baltimore for decades.  Southern State cooks, Marylanders insist, boil crabs and along with it, boil away all the true flavor.  The crabs are eaten on tables spread with old newspaper or plain brown wrapping paper. The meat of the crabs is extracted with the use of wooden mallets, knives, and one's hands. It is popular for cold beer to be thrown on the crabs during the steaming process, and made available afterwards.

Crab cakes
A traditional Baltimore crab cake generally consists of steamed blue crab lump and/or backfin meat, egg, mayonnaise, Old Bay seafood seasoning, cracker crumbs, and mustard. It is prepared by either broiling or frying.  Baltimoreans typically do not use tartar sauce on their crab cakes.

Soft crab sandwiches
Soft shell crabs are blue crabs which have recently molted their old exoskeleton and are still soft. The entire animal can be eaten, rather than having to shell the animal to reach the meat. The crab is typically tossed in flour to which some combination of salt, pepper and Old Bay Seasoning have been added, before being deep fried or sauteed in butter.  It is then placed on toasted bread, typically dressed with mayonnaise, sliced tomato and lettuce. Some Baltimoreans find amusement in watching visitors to the city stare in horror as they eat soft crab sandwiches with the crab legs sticking out the sides.

Sauerkraut
It is a common practice to serve sauerkraut with the Thanksgiving turkey. Baltimore was a leading gateway for German immigration during the 19th century.  By 1863, the year President Abraham Lincoln declared Thanksgiving a national holiday, one in four of Baltimore's residents were transplanted Germans and spoke the tongue as their first language.

Pit beef
Pit beef refers to open pit barbecued meat most commonly served rare on a Kaiser roll, usually found at small stands converted from large sheds in and around Baltimore and the outlying suburbs. It originated on Baltimore's blue collar east side and has through the years spread all over the city. Other varieties of meat, such as ham, turkey, corned beef, and sausages are also found on the menus at pit beef stands. Pit beef meat is grilled with charcoal and uses no rubs or sauces, so it lacks the wood flavor characteristic of Texas barbecue and the herbal aromas of Carolina barbecue. Baltimore pit beef uses top round and is shaved very thin on a meat slicer for serving. The typical condiments for a pit beef sandwich are a thick slice of white onion and a sauce made from horseradish and mayonnaise commonly called "Tiger Sauce." Made by Tulkoff Food Products, it is unique in that the Baltimore version uses a much more significant portion of horseradish, making the sauce extremely hot.

Bull and oyster roasts
Bull roasts and oyster roasts are fund-raising events held in Baltimore and neighboring counties. Tickets are sold per person or discounted by the table (seating 8–10 people). They are scheduled during the "R" months (September–April), when oysters are prevalent. The menu may consist of pit beef, ham, turkey, or oysters, the latter being variously served fried, raw (on the half shell), or stewed with buttery milk or cream. Typically, a smorgasbord of side dishes (such as mashed potatoes, macaroni and cheese, green beans, cole slaw) is featured along with a fresh salad bar. Beer and wine may be purchased while standard drinks (soda, iced tea) are included with the purchase of the ticket.

In addition to the profits from tickets sales, a variety of gambling and other fundraising activities are often features, such as a wheel where one bets on numbers (similar to a simplified roulette game), raffles, or auctions. The prizes might be monetary or items donated by local residents, organizations, businesses, or sports heroes.

Lake trout
"Lake trout" is actually fried Atlantic whiting. It is typically served as a sandwich with a number of condiments, such as ketchup and horseradish sauce. Lake trout is an everyday food, and is often served wrapped in aluminum foil in a standard paper lunch bag at small take-out establishments.

Chicken box
The "chicken box" consists of 4–6 chicken wings, served in a fast food carry out box with some kind of French fries (wedged "western fries", curly fries, or regular fries). Toppings usually consist of salt, pepper, and ketchup, although hot sauce is also popular. The item is chiefly sold at independent fried chicken shops and deli/Chinese carry-outs in the city. Chicken boxes are usually enjoyed with "Half and Half", a drink combining iced tea and lemonade (referred to elsewhere in the United States as an "Arnold Palmer").

Berger Cookies
Berger Cookies are a kind of cookie that enjoys immense popularity in Baltimore and Washington, D.C. They are made from vanilla shortbread covered in a fudge ganache. The recipe was originally brought from Germany to Baltimore by George and Henry Berger in 1835; they are now produced and sold by DeBaufre Bakeries.

Rheb's Homemade Candies
Newlyweds Louis and Esther Rheb moved into their new home at 3352 Wilkens Avenue in 1917.  The following year, Louis, self-taught, started making taffies, brittles, fudge, and jellies in his basement. The candies were sold in the markets twice a week, Esther going to Hollins and Louis to Bel Air. In the mid-1930s, they opened in Lexington Market. Louis continued to develop more recipes, and Esther learned to hand-dip the centers in a smooth and velvety chocolate that they had blended to complement each piece of candy. Many people came to Wilkens Avenue to buy candy, so they converted their garage into a store. The grand opening took place in 1950. Nowadays, it is Rheb's main store. On Valentine's Day, there is typically a long line of customers outside Rheb's on Wilkens Avenue.

Goetze's Candies
The Goetze's Candy Company was founded in Baltimore and the factory remains there today. Their caramel creams are a soft chewy caramel with a cream center that is similar to cake icing and are found in most corner stores and convenience markets in Baltimore.

Lemon peppermint sticks
Lemon peppermint sticks are a treat sold at the mid-spring Flower Mart held by the Women's Civic League. These simple "drinks" are made by cutting the top off a small lemon, cutting a hole into the flesh, and shoving a peppermint stick into it. Sucking on the stick and squeezing the lemon produces a sweet, minty, lemony drink. While mostly sold at Flower Mart, throughout summer people in Baltimore will make these treats at home or at social gatherings as well.

Natty Boh
The city's locally favored beer has traditionally been National Bohemian, commonly referred to as "Natty Boh" or "National" by locals, or "Nasty Boh" by its detractors. The beer and its round cartoon face mascot, Mr. Boh, are traditional parts of Baltimore culture. The historically low price and association with the city make it a local favorite.

Natty Boh was the long-time beer of choice for Orioles and Colts fans at Memorial Stadium. After the Colts moved to Indianapolis in 1984 and the Orioles left Memorial Stadium in 1991, Natty Boh was no longer available to fans at Baltimore sporting events. In 2000, brewing of the beer in Baltimore was discontinued. However, since the 2006 Orioles season, "Boh is Back" and served at Oriole Park at Camden Yards. National Bohemian beer is currently brewed out of state by the Miller Brewing Company and is distributed to Baltimore by the Pabst Brewing Company.

The National Brewing Company was also the "inventor" of Colt 45 malt liquor in 1963.

Geography
Baltimore is divided into several vastly different neighborhoods and regions, all of which hold their own reputation in terms of their crime rates and average income, among other stereotypes. Canton, Baltimore is well known for its young, professional population, alongside its several nightclubs and comedy clubs. The Inner Harbor is home to Baltimore's tourist center. M&T Bank Stadium and Oriole Park at Camden Yards, home to the Baltimore Ravens and the Baltimore Orioles.
respectively, are also in the Inner Harbor's vicinity.

Architecture

Row Houses

Baltimore is noted for its near-omnipresent row houses. Row houses have been a feature of Baltimore architecture since the 1790s, with early examples of the style still standing in the Federal Hill, Locust Point, and Fells Point neighborhoods.https://baltimoreheritage.org/resources/anatomy-of-a-rowhouse/ Older houses may retain some of their original features, such as marble doorsteps, widely considered to be Baltimore icons in themselves. Later row houses dating from the 1800s–1900s can be found in Union Square and throughout the city in various states of repair. They are a popular renovation property in neighborhoods that are undergoing urban renewal, although the practice is viewed warily by some as a harbinger of "yuppification", particularly when the term "townhouse" is used instead of "row house." Around the city, row houses can be found abandoned and boarded up, reflecting Baltimore's urban blight.

Formstone
A tour through many of Baltimore's row house neighborhoods will reveal a façade style not found in many other cities: Formstone. Introduced in the 1950s, Formstone was a modern-day solution to early Baltimore brick that was so poor it needed frequent painting to keep it from deteriorating. But soon Formstone became an icon of status for many homeowners.

The appeal of Formstone was that, once installed, it required virtually no maintenance. Salesmen boasted that the installation lasted forever and that the first cost was also the last as no upkeep or repair was required. Salesmen also pointed out that Formstone was also about one-third the cost of other façade improvement solutions. Its colorful stucco veneer gave a stone-like appearance that could be shaped into different textures. Formstone was particularly popular in East Baltimore, where residents believed that the stone imitation made their neighborhood resemble that of an Eastern European town, which some thought had an appearance of affluence.

Patented in 1937 by L. Albert Knight, Formstone was similar to a product that was invented eight years earlier in Columbus, Ohio, and called Permanent Stone. Permanent Stone was also a veneer. In the 1970s preservationists and rehabbers felt that Formstone took away from the historic and architectural value of the homes and many had it removed. This can be a costly and time-consuming process. Once removed, the brick requires a thorough acid-wash cleaning and then repointing of the grout.

Marble steps

Marble steps are frequently used at the front entrances of row houses in Baltimore. The use of marble for steps is due to the presence of high quality white marble in Cockeysville, a town 17 miles north of Baltimore's Inner Harbor by highway. The marble found there is of such quality that it was preferred over the products of the much closer Potomac marble quarries for many public structures in Washington, D.C., including the Washington Monument, and 108 columns of the Capitol building itself. During the construction of the Washington Monument in the mid-19th century, the marble gained in popularity as a decorative stone and was used widely for the steps of row houses surrounding Baltimore's inner harbor and in Fells Point. Scrubbing marble steps with Bon Ami powder and a pumice stone has become a tradition in Baltimore.

Slang

Baltimoreans have a distinct way of pronouncing words in the English language. Typically, many syllables are simply dropped (e.g., Annapolis becomes Napliss). The accent varies; the accent is not as noticeable when spoken by North & West Baltimoreans but is at its heaviest when spoken by East & South Baltimoreans.

Hon

Although nowadays the city is culturally diverse, the lasting image of Baltimoreans seems to be the "Hon" culture exemplified most markedly by the longer established families and residents of the Highlandtown, Irvington, Canton, Locust Point, Hampden and Pigtown neighborhoods. Between the 1950s and 1970s, it was common to see local working class women dressing in bright, printed dresses with glasses and beehive hairdos. Men were often dressed casually, but with a general factory or dock worker look, as many in town did indeed have such jobs.

The name of the culture comes from the often parodied Baltimore accent and slang. "Hon" (an abbreviation of "Honey") was a common informal name for someone else. It is almost always used at the end of the sentence, e.g., "how bout dem O's, Hon?" Linguists classify the white Baltimore accent within Delaware Valley American English, which also encompasses Philadelphia. For instance, "Baltimore" is pronounced "Baldamore" or even "Balmer", and "Maryland" becomes "Murland", "Murlan", or "Merlin." Other common pronunciations include "ool", "amblance", "wooder", "warsh", "sharr or shaow", "far", "cowny", "tew", “lor” and "zinc" (oil, ambulance, water, wash, shower, fire, county, two, “lil”, and sink respectively). There is also a popular summertime phrase, "goin' downy ayshin" (going down to the ocean, usually referring to Ocean City, Maryland) as well as popular phrases such as, "my (appliance) went up" (meaning died, shortened from "went up to heaven") and "dem O's" (i.e. "them O's", referring to the city's Major League Baseball team, the Baltimore Orioles).

Baltimore native and filmmaker John Waters has parodied the Hon culture, as well as Baltimore itself, extensively in his movies. For a somewhat accurate representation of Baltimorese, one can look to Waters' narration in his 1972 movie Pink Flamingos. Waters himself used a local commercial for Mr Ray's Hair Weaves as his main inspiration. The commercial was famous around town for Mr. Ray's thick East Baltimore accent: "Cawl todaey, for your free hayome showink..." ("Call today, for your free home showing") was the most memorable line from that commercial.

The term has been established in the culture as it has been used for naming businesses including Cafe Hon, and for the annual HonFest.

"Hon" as a trademark
In November 2010, the term "Hon" was trademarked in Baltimore by local businesswoman Denise Whiting, for use on napkins, buttons, hats and other promotional material for her restaurant, Cafe Hon. The trademark, as stated by Whiting, doesn't prevent anyone from saying "Hon", or using it in general conversation.  However, the trademark issue proved to be controversial, and was criticized by Dan Rodricks, columnist for The Baltimore Sun: "You can't own something that doesn't belong to you.... 'Hon' isn't unique to Denise Whiting, no matter how special she wants us to believe she is."
The dispute prompted street protests on December 19, 2010, by Baltimore residents.

On November 7, 2011, Whiting held a press conference that also featured Chef Gordon Ramsay announcing that she would be relinquishing the "Hon" trademark; Ramsay stated that with Cafe Hon, "There was a level of hatred that was almost untouchable. I've never known a restaurant to have such a huge issue." The restaurant, and the press conference that was part of Ramsay's visit, was featured on the February 24, 2012, episode of Ramsay's series, Kitchen Nightmares.

Whiting stated that the controversy over trademarking the word "Hon" took a huge toll on her business and her own health. She estimated that since it was first revealed in December 2010 that "Hon" was trademarked to her, the restaurant suffered a "20 to 25 percent drop off" in sales and that she needed to sell her IRAs just to meet payroll.

Musical and literary culture
Baltimore's most enduring music legacy might be in the realm of "old school" jazz where a number of natives made the big time after moving to New York City. Chick Webb, Eubie Blake, and Billie Holiday were all originally from Baltimore before moving on. The same zeitgeist also applies to classical minimalist composer Philip Glass, also from Baltimore and moved to NYC. 

Others that would find fame in the music business from the area would include jazz-rock composer Frank Zappa, singer Ric Ocasek of The Cars, pop vocalist Mama Cass, and Talking Heads frontman David Byrne. 

Baltimore Club is a locally developed style of breakbeat.

In the 2000s, several local alternative/indie bands have risen to national prominence, including Beach House, Animal Collective, Future Islands, Wye Oak, Dan Deacon; however, most of these bands are not native to Baltimore, and moved there in the mid-2000s from other areas of the country such as North Carolina, Purchase, NY, and Long Island. Wye Oak left Baltimore in the mid-2010s.

From the 1860s to the 1880s a number of periodicals were published in Baltimore, including Southern Magazine, South Atlantic, Southern Society, and Continental Magazine.

Depiction in television and film

Baltimore has become a prime city for filming movies and television shows. Many movies were filmed in Baltimore, one notable one being ...And Justice for All (film) which depicts an honest young attorney coming to grips with a corrupt legal system. Additionally, television shows such as NBC's Homicide: Life on the Street and HBO's The Wire and The Corner have also been set and filmed in the city.

Barry Levinson, a Baltimore native and filmmaker, made many Baltimore-based films, including: Diner, Avalon, Tin Men, and Liberty Heights. Baltimoreans are extremely fond of Levinson's movies as his actors either use a thick East Baltimore accent or the lighter West Baltimore accent.

Another Baltimore native and filmmaker, John Waters, makes subversive films that glamorize the less socially acceptable side of the city's culture. Many scenes from the 1972 cult classic film Pink Flamingos were shot in the city's Waverly and Hampden neighborhoods. Pink Flamingos was the most popular of Waters' cult films. In 1981, Waters released the more mainstream Polyester with "Odorama" and went on to make Cecil B. Demented, Cry-baby, Pecker, and Serial Mom.

To date, Hairspray, Waters' tribute to The Buddy Deane Show-era Baltimore, has been his most successful commercial effort. He released Hairspray as a film in 1988. In 2002, Hairspray was produced as a stage musical. In 2007, a new version of Hairspray was released as a film. Soundtracks for both films and the musical have also proven popular. Waters is currently in the works of making a sequel to Hairspray.

In addition to works filmed in Baltimore, the city is also home to the Maryland Film Festival, an annual film and video festival of international scope that takes place each May, using the historic Charles Theatre as its anchor venue.

In Season 4, Episode 7 of The Tracey Ullman Show, Baltimore native actor Michael Tucker portrayed the father of Ullman's JoJo character. The skit was set in a Baltimore row house. Tucker advised Ullman to "take a Liverpool accent and Americanize it."

When Welcome Back, Kotter first aired in 1975, some Baltimoreans were shocked to hear the word "sweathog" which, at that time, meant "whore" in many Baltimore neighborhoods. Nowadays, "sweathog" is used to describe an overweight, smelly woman.

Sports

Jousting is the official state sport and Lacrosse is the official "team sport" of the State of Maryland and is very popular in Baltimore. City colleges with Division 1 men's and women's teams include Johns Hopkins, Loyola, UMBC, and Towson. The Lacrosse Museum and National Hall of Fame is located on the Johns Hopkins campus. The city is also home to high-school national championship legacy teams from Boys' Latin, and Gilman on the boy's side, to Bryn Mawr and RPCS on the girls side. The Morgan "Bears" competed during the 1970s and 1980s; the school now has a lacrosse club. M&T Bank Stadium, the home of the Baltimore Ravens, hosts the annual lacrosse double-header events, the Face-Off Classic and Day of Rivals, which have featured several Maryland-based teams. The stadium was the site of the NCAA Men's Lacrosse Final Four in 2003, 2004, 2007, 2010 and 2011.

Lore and traditions

It is customary before a Baltimore Ravens game to tap the shoe of the statue of Johnny Unitas, Baltimore's star quarterback of the mid twentieth century while the Colts were still playing in the city. This is seen as a good luck charm for the game to come.

When the national anthem is played at an Orioles or Ravens game, the word "oh" is emphasized in the line "oh say does that star spangled banner yet wave" by the crowd to show allegiance to the Orioles, using their nickname, the O's. Some national onlookers regard this custom as disrespectful to the nation's anthem.

Nicknames are widely used in Baltimore to refer to certain sports figures or moments. Several Orioles players of the modern era have earned themselves nicknames which have quickly become traditional, such as Chris Davis receiving the nickname "Crush Davis" following his record-setting 2013 season and Nelson Cruz, whose last name is chanted in an elongated fashion whenever he makes a big play at home. The 2012 postseason game between the Ravens and the Broncos has picked up several nicknames, such as the "Mile High Miracle", the "F-bomb", and the "Rocky Mountain Rainbow", each referring particularly to Joe Flacco's pass to Jacoby Jones for a Baltimore touchdown which led to a victory, eventually leading the Ravens to win Super Bowl XLVII.

When the Orioles are thrown into situations where they succeed spectacularly, especially when overcoming an adversarial situation, it is known by the Baltimore community as "Orioles Magic". This term was popularized by the local station WFBR when announcers reacted to Doug DeCinces' walk-off home run over the Detroit Tigers in 1979 by shouting "it might get out of here", followed by an eruption of fan cheering at Memorial Stadium.

Eating Esskay hot dogs and drinking National Bohemian beer at Baltimore sporting events, particularly at Orioles games, has become a long-lasting tradition. National Bohemian is commonly referred to as "Natty Boh" by venues and Baltimoreans.

The term "Birdland" is commonly used to refer to the Baltimore area's fanbase for both the Ravens and the Orioles. MASN, the Orioles' broadcasting network, is commonly accredited with popularizing this term thanks to their promos.

The song Seven Nation Army was popularized in Baltimore as the Ravens' official pump-up song. Seven Nation Army was first played at the Ravens opening game of 2011 against the Steelers, and has been played at every home game since. It can often be heard at Orioles games as well, with fans often singing the signature first two bars of the song as "Oh Oh Oh Oh Oh Oh", referring to the O's (Orioles)

Tourist attractions

American Dime Museum (closed February 2007)
American Visionary Art Museum
Babe Ruth Birthplace Museum
Baltimore Ghost Tours
Baltimore Maritime Museum
Baltimore Museum of Art
Baltimore Museum of Industry
Baltimore Public Works Museum (closed February 2010)
Baltimore Streetcar Museum
Basilica of the National Shrine of the Assumption of the Blessed Virgin Mary
B&O Railroad Museum
Brown Memorial Presbyterian Church
Charles Theatre
Contemporary Museum (suspended operations in 2012)
Cylburn Arboretum
Druid Hill Park
Edgar Allan Poe House and Museum
Edgar Allan Poe's grave
Enoch Pratt Free Library
Evergreen House museum and library
Fells Point Historic Neighborhood
Fort McHenry National Monument
George Peabody Library
Great Blacks In Wax Museum
Harborplace
Hippodrome Theatre
Historic Ships in Baltimore
Homewood Museum
Howard Peters Rawlings Conservatory and Botanic Gardens of Baltimore
The Jewish Museum of Maryland
Lacrosse Museum and National Hall of Fame
Lexington Market
Lyric Opera House
Maryland Film Festival
Maryland Center for History and Culture
Maryland Science Center
Maryland Zoo in Baltimore
Meyerhoff Symphony Hall
National Aquarium in Baltimore
National Historic Seaport Scenic Byway
National Museum of Dentistry
Patterson Park
Pimlico Race Course
Port Discovery
Pride of Baltimore II Clipper Ship
Reginald F. Lewis Museum of Maryland African American History & Culture
The Senator Theatre
Star Spangled Banner Flag House and 1812 Museum
Baltimore World Trade Center observation deck
Walters Art Museum
Westminster Hall and Burying Ground

Nouns

People

 Dwight Schultz
 Alan Ameche
 Arabbers
 Baltimore Colts' Marching Band
 Celebration
 George William Brown
 Winston "Buddy" Deane
 Ta-Nehisi Coates
 Art Donovan
 Babe Ruth
 Wye Oak
 Johnny Eck
 Charley Eckman
 Robert Ehrlich
 Aharon Feldman
 Emanuel Feldman
 Felicia "Snoop" Pearson
 Duff Goldman
 Wild Bill Hagy
 Billie Holiday
 Johns Hopkins
 Mo'Nique Hicks
 Stu Kerr
 Barry Levinson
 Gino Marchetti
 H. L. Mencken
 Brooks Robinson
 Al Sanders
 Jerry Turner (anchorman)
 Plug Uglies
 Edgar Allan Poe
 William Donald Schaefer
 Spank Rock
 Johnny Unitas
 John Waters
 Edward Witten
 Frank Zappa
 Cass Elliot
 Yaakov Weinberg
 Yaakov Yitzchak Ruderman
 Walter P. Carter
 Michael Phelps

Places

 American Brewery
 Baltimore Basilica
 Baltimore Convention Center
 Baltimore Zoo
 Bromo-Seltzer Tower
 Chesapeake Bay
 Civic Center
 Downtown Baltimore
 Flag House
 Fort McHenry
 Great Blacks in Wax Museum
 Hochschild Kohn's
 Johns Hopkins Hospital
 Hutzler's
 Inner Harbor
 Lexington Market
 List of Baltimore neighborhoods
 Memorial Stadium
 Senator Theatre
 Peabody Bookshop and Beer Stube
 The Shot Tower
 Sparrows Point Shipyard
 Stewart's

Things

 Baltimore Club
 The Baltimore Colts (1947–50) and Baltimore Colts (1953–1983)
 The Baltimore Ravens
 Baltimore News-American
 Baltimorese
 The Baltimore Sun
 Blue crabs
 Clipper City
 Delphian Club
 Duckpin bowling
 Formstone
 HonFest
 Know-Nothing Riot of 1856
 Kinetic Sculpture Race
 Music of Baltimore
 National Bohemian
 Old Bay Seasoning
 Pride of Baltimore
 Screen painting
 STX
 The "O's"
 Under Armour

References

External links